Bert L. Rule (né Albert Lyman Rule; 12 August 1891 Brooklyn; – 17 August 1978 East Patchogue, New York) was an American composer, arranger, singer, and pianist of popular songs of Tin Pan Alley and the vaudeville genre. Rule composed and published his music, some of which became national hits, from 1913 to 1934. He worked in publishing houses, namely M. Witmark & Sons and performed in vaudeville theaters throughout the country roughly during the same period.

Career highlights 
 Brennan & Rule (circa 1918–1920)

In 1918 and 1919, while under contract with M. Witmark & Sons, Rule performed vaudeville shows with lyricist J. Keirn Brennan, both signing compositions they wrote together, with Rule accompanying on piano. Their biggest nationwide hit at the time was Have a Smile for Everyone You Meet and Gates of Gladness.

 O'Brien & Rule (circa 1923–1925)

In 1924, Rule performed as a singing composer, with John O'Brien, as singing comedian, in a vaudeville show at the Lyceum in Canton, Ohio.  There is an article and advertisement in an October 1924 Toronto newspaper stating that Rule and O'Brien was to perform at Shea's Hippodrome in Toronto.  There are also advertisements in 1924 issues of The Plain Dealer showing Rule and O'Brien performing at B. F. Keith's Palace in Cleveland.  There is a 1926 article in a 1926 issue of The Times, Batavia, New York stating that Rule and O'Brien was performing at Shea's in Buffalo.

Selected compositions 

 Various publishers

 Way Down East, Sailors Don't Care, words & music by H. Wallis & G. Feist, Bert Rule (publisher unknown) (1923) 

 Published by A. J. Stasny Music Co.

 Down Where the Tennessee Flows, words by Ray Sherwood, music by Bert L. Rule (1913) 
 I Did It All For You, words by Ray Sherwood, music by Bert L. Rule (1914) 
 I'm Goin Back to Old Nebraska, words by Ray Sherwood, music by Bert L. Rule, cover artist Edward Henry Pfeiffer (1868–1932) (1914) 
 There's a Girl That's Meant for Me: in the Heart of Tennessee, words by Ray Sherwood, music by Burt L. Rule (1914) 
 Why Shouldn't I Love You, words by Ray Sherwood, music by Bert L. Rule (1915) 
 Sweetheart - Time, one step, by Milbury Ryder & Bert Rule (1915)   (arr. for band) 

 Published by Allan & Co., Melbourne

 Shadows will fade away, words by J. Keirn Brennan, music by Bert Rule (1919)  
 The Gates of Gladness (On the Road To Sunshine Land), by J. Keirn Brennan, Paul Cunningham & Bert Rule (1919)  
 Sligo (just to hear my mother sing), Irish waltz ballad, words by J. Keirn Brennan, music by Bert Rule (1920) 
 That's How I Believe in You, waltz ballad, words by Al Dubin & Paul Cunningham, music by Bert Rule (1921) 

 Published by M. Witmark & Sons

 I want to see my Ida Hoe in Idaho, words by Alex Sullivan, music by Bert Rule (1918) 
 Have a Smile for Everyone You Meet, and They Will Have a Smile for You, words by J. Keirn Brennan & Paul Cunningham, music by Bert Rule (1918)   
 If You Don't Stop Making Eyes at Me, I'm Goin' to Make Eyes at You, words and music by J. Keirn Brennan, Paul Cunningham, & Bert Rule (1919)  
 Shadows Will Fade Away, ballad fox trot, words by J. Keirn Brennan, music by Bert Rule (1919)  
 My Sampan Man, words by J. Keirn Brennan, music by Bert Rule (1919) 
 The Gates of Gladness (on the Road to Sunshine Land), by J. Keirn Brennan, Paul Cunningham & Bert Rule (1919)   
 Ain't It Grand in New Orleans, words by J. Keirn Brennan, music by Bert Rule (1919) 
 Why must we say goodbye? by Sam Ash, J. Keirn Brennan & Bert Rule (1920) 
 She's the Heart of Dixieland, words by Ray Sherwood, music by Burt L. Rule (1920) 
 Just a week from to-day, novelty fox trot song, words by Paul Cunningham & Al Dubin, music by Bert Rule (1920) 
 On a Far Alone Isle, novelty fox trot ballad, words by J. Keirn Brennan, music by Bert Rule (1921) 
 I Want To Rock-a-Bye My Mammy, Like She Used To Rock-a-Bye Me, by Al Dubin, Paul Cunningham & Bert Rule (1921)  
 That's How I Believe in You, waltz ballad,	words by Al Dubin & Paul Cunningham, music by Bert Rule (1921) 
 Ireland Must Be a Garden, If You Are a Wild Irish Rose, fox trot song, words by George Graff, music by Bert Rule (1923)

Selected arrangements 

 Published by Santly Bros.

 I Never Dreamt: You'd Fall in Love With Me, by Donovan Parsons & Vivian Ellis, arr. by Frank Skinner, vocal trio arrangement by Bert L. Rule (1928) 
 F'r instance, fox trot, by Paul Denniker, arranged by Archie Bleyer, includes a vocal trio arr. by Bert L. Rule (1930) 
 When the Organ Played at Twilight, waltz, words by Raymond Wallace, music by Jimmy Campbell & Reg Connelly, arr. by William Conrad Polla, vocal trio arr. by Bert Rule (1930) 
 By my side, fox trot, words by Dorothy Dick & Bert Lown, music by Harry Link & Chauncey Gray, arranged by Frank Skinner, trio arrangement by Bert L. Rule (1931) 
 My Cradle Sweetheart, waltz, lyrics by Charles Newman, music by Isham Jones, arr. by Bob Haring, includes a vocal trio arrangement by Bert L. Rule (1931) 
 June Time is Love Time, For Everyone But Me, fox trot, 	words by Sidney Clare & Charles Tobias, music by Al Sherman, arr. by Frank Skinner, includes a vocal trio arrangement by Bert L. Rule (1931) 
 Building a home for you, fox-trot, words by Gus Kahn, music by Joseph H. Santly & Joe Bennett, arr. by Fred Loring (1931) 
 I'm an unemployed sweetheart, looking for somebody to love, fox trot, words by Edgar Leslie & Ned Washington, music by James V. Monaco, arranged by Art McKay, trio arrangement by Bert L. Rule (1931) 

 Santly Bros. WFAA Collection

 Concentratin' (on you), words by Andy Razaf, music by Thomas Waller, trio arr. by Bert L. Rule (1931) 
 At the Baby Parade, novelty fox-trot, by Jack Little, Dave Oppenheim & Ira Schuster, vocal trio arr. by Bert L. Rule (1932) 
 When it's Darkness on the Delta, fox-trot, vocal trio, words by Marty Symes & Al J. Neiburg, music by Jerry Levinson, arr. by Bert L. Rule (1932) 
 It's the talk of the town, vocal trio, 	words by Marty Symes & Al J. Neiburg, music by Jerry Levinson, arr. by Bert L. Rule (1933) 
 Under a Blanket of Blue, fox trot, words by Marty Symes & Al J. Neiburg, music by Jerry Levinson, vocal trio arr. by Bert L. Rule (1933) 
 Out in the Cold Again, vocal trio, words by Ted Koehler, music by Rube Bloom, arr. by Bert L. Rule (1934) 
 It's All Forgotten Now, vocal trio, words and music by Ray Noble, arr. by Bert L. Rule (1934) 
 Spellbound, fox trot, vocal trio, words by Stanley Adams, music by Jesse Greer, arr. by Bert L. Rule (1934)

Selected discography 
 Historic recordings

 Have a smile Sterling Trio Victor 18518 (4 December 1918)
 The gates of gladness (on the road to Sunshine Land)  Shannon Four, Lewis James, Victor 18590 (28 May 1919)
 That's how I believe in you Henry Burr, Victor 18848 (27 October 1921)

 Cylinder recordings
 Just a week from to-day, sung by Aileen Stanley with orchestra, 1219 – Edison Blue Amberol: 4293 (1921)

Family 
Albert Lyman Rule was married to Jessie Jack Ellen Laurie (1894-1978). They had a son and a daughter: Donald J. Rule (born 1915–2008) and Edna J. Rule (born 1921-1990).

References 

American male composers
1891 births
1978 deaths
Musicians from New York City
20th-century American composers
20th-century American male musicians